The Maropa People are an ethnic group in Bolivia. There were 4,505 of them in 2012 of whom 57 speak the Maropa language natively.

References

Ethnic groups in Bolivia